"Even the Losers" is a song written by Tom Petty and recorded by Tom Petty and the Heartbreakers.  It is featured on their breakthrough hit 1979 album, Damn the Torpedoes. It is also featured on the band's 1993 Greatest Hits album.  A live recording of it is included in the box set The Live Anthology. It has become one of the highest regarded songs of Petty's repertoire. The song was not released as a single except in Australia. The song peaked at #11 on the Billboard lyric find.

Writing and recording
The song was inspired by a night Petty had spent with a woman named Cindy and some friends in his hometown of Gainesville, Florida when he was young.  Cindy had been the object of a junior high school crush of his.  Unlike in school, Cindy liked him that night. It was also during that night Petty had an epiphany and realized he needed to be in a rock and roll band.  The next morning Cindy said their relationship was limited to the previous night.  Years later, that night was very much on his mind when he wrote "Even the Losers."

During the recording session, guitarist Mike Campbell struggled to come up with a guitar solo.  Petty asked, "Well, what would Chuck Berry do?" Within minutes, the solo was recorded.

Before the track starts there is a female voice heard saying, "It's just the normal noises in here!"  The voice is that of Campbell's wife Marcie from a demo recording Campbell had made in his home, replying after he had complained about the noise of a nearby washing machine.

Critical reception
Rolling Stone ranked the song at 19 of Petty's greatest songs, ranked above other songs that were successful singles, such as "You Got Lucky" and "Jammin' Me". Corbin Reiff of Uproxx ranked it at 15 of Petty's best songs. The Washington Post included "Even the Losers" on their list of 10 of Petty's best songs.

Writing for Uproxx, critic John Kurp wrote, "'Even The Losers' sums up Petty's career more than any other track in his hits-stuff discography" and the song "is the sound of pure pain. It's an ode for anyone stuck in the 'glory days,' for the lovesick fools who can't separate the good times ('We smoked cigarettes and we stared at the moon') from the bad ('I shoulda known right then it was too good to last'), and how much that hurts. And yet, I see 'Even the Losers' as somewhat optimistic."

Personnel
Tom Petty – lead vocals, rhythm guitar
Mike Campbell – lead guitar
Ron Blair – bass guitar
Stan Lynch – drums
Benmont Tench – piano, organ

Cover versions
In 2012, Pat Green covered "Even the Losers" for his cover album, Songs We Wish We'd Written II.
In 2017, Ryan Adams performed the song at the Austin City Limits Music Festival as a tribute to Petty.

References

Tom Petty songs
1979 songs
Songs written by Tom Petty